Baburao Pendharkar (22 June 18968 November 1967), was an Indian actor, director, film producer and writer.

Personal life
Baburao Pendharkar was born on 22 June 1896 in Kolhapur in a Brahmin family. Born to Radhabai and her patron Dr Gopal Pendharkar, Baburao was related to quite a few film personalities in Indian film industry. His younger brother Bhalji Pendharkar was a famous film director, producer and writer. Other famous names in family included half-brother Master Vinayak, Radhabai's son after she married Karnataki, cousin V. Shantaram, son of Kamalabai, Radhabai's younger sister. Baburao married Shree Kumudini and had two sons and daughters each with her.

He died on November 8, 1967 in Bombay aged 71.

Film career
Baburao started his career in the era of silent films.

Actor (68 credits)

Director (5 credits)
 1952/I Vishwamitra
 1933 Seeta Kalyanam
 1930 Swajara Doran
 1926 Sarkari Praser
 1921 Sharashandri

Producer (2 credits)
 1944 Draupadi (producer)
 1927 Vande Mataram Ashram (producer)

Writer (1 credit)
 1930 Udaykal

References

External links
 

1896 births
1967 deaths
Indian male film actors
Marathi film directors
Marathi film producers
Indian male screenwriters
People from Kolhapur
20th-century Indian male actors
20th-century Indian dramatists and playwrights
Screenwriters from Maharashtra
Male actors from Maharashtra
Film producers from Maharashtra
Indian male silent film actors
20th-century Indian film directors
Film directors from Maharashtra
20th-century Indian male writers
20th-century Indian screenwriters